Sacandaga may refer to:

In New York:
Sacandaga River, a tributary of the Hudson River
Great Sacandaga Lake, formerly the Sacandaga Reservoir, in the Adirondack State Park
Sacandaga Lake, a small lake in Hamilton County

Ships:

, also known as the Sacandaga